Azra ou el-Azr (also spelled  or simply Azra) is a municipality located in the Keserwan District of the Keserwan-Jbeil Governorate in Lebanon. It has an average elevation of 750 meters above sea level, a total land area of 113 hectares and is bordered by the villages of Zaaitreh, Zeitoun, Mradiyeh, Jouret Bedran and Ghbaleh.

Feasts and festivals 
Each summer, the monastery of the village organizes a four-day festival preceding the feast of Saints Peter and Paul on June 29. In addition, Saint Charbel is celebrated on the third Sunday of July, Saint Elias on July 20, Saint Stephen on August 2 and Saint Dometius on August 7.

Notable people 
 Doumit Ghanem, fitness model and media personality

Etymology 
The etymology of the name can be interpreted in several ways. On the one hand, some assume that the village bears the name of the Virgin, "عذراء" in Arabic, while others claim that it is named after the tree of "Ezr", once abundant in the village and its region. On the other hand, it may be of Aramaic origin, "Ezr" meaning the support, the column, or even a herd of sheep or goats.

Places of worship 
The village has five places of worship at its disposal:
 Monastery of Sts. Peter and Paul (inaugurated in 1854)
 St. Elijah Church
 St. Stephen Church
 St. Dometius Church
 Chapel of Our Lady of Lourdes

Activities 
The infrastructure of the village is very modern and the communications are very animated. Many believers and pilgrims head to the village monastery to pray and relax spiritually. 
The monastery carries out a large number of activities. School and teaching, exhibitions and concerts, conferences, prayers, social activities ... The superior of the monastery animates through his activities the whole region. 
The village has a sports stadium, a football team and a basketball team, both participating in local and regional tournaments.

Demography 
The village population is around 550 electors. The majority of this population is settled in Jounieh and its suburbs and treat the village as a summer destination to get away from the heat and bustle of the city.  The inhabitants of Aazra are mainly followers of the Maronite Church.

Families 
The major surname in Aazra is Kamel. The majority of those who bear this name are generally from the village. There are also inhabitants from the Imad, Ghanem, Korkmaz, Hosri and Zouein families. 
The Ghanem family and the Hosri family occupy the lower district of el-Azr, while the rest live in the upper part of the village.

References

Populated places in Keserwan District
Maronite Christian communities in Lebanon